Balltown is an unincorporated community in Nelson County, in the U.S. state of Kentucky.

History
A post office was established at Balltown in 1884, and remained in operation until 1904. The community was named in honor of James Ball, a pioneer settler.

References

Unincorporated communities in Nelson County, Kentucky
Unincorporated communities in Kentucky